La Virgen de las Siete Calles (Spanish for: "The Virgin of the Seven Streets") is a Bolivian telenovela adapted from a novel with the same name by Alfredo Flores. Produced by Santa Cruz Films Productions in 1987 with a total of 15 chapters, the TV drama was adapted for television and directed by Enrique Alfonso and Juan Miranda.

Synopsis
It tells the story of Zora Abrego, only daughter of Antorio and Aurora, who died in a hunting accident and fire. 
After losing her parents, Zora is in the charge of her aunt Paulina, who hated the girl because she envied the life of Aurora. 
When Zora, the "Virgin", matures, she is virtually sold by her aunt to Juvenal Roca, who after a while fleeing after committing a crime. Zora meets the newcomer Carlos Toledo at a party. Romance develops between them after the return of Juvenal, but ends in tragedy.

Profile of the characters
 Zora Abrego, a beautiful woman who received the nickname "The Virgen of the Seven Streets" because, since childhood, her features were so perfect that she compared her with  a Virgin by the residents of the area "The 7 streets" (Las Siete Calles) of Santa Cruz at 1920. Her blue eyes and honey-colored hair gave him such a characteristic that differed from the other girls.
 Carlos Toledo, a young student, returning from Buenos Aires after several years to fix an economic problem that prevented him from completing their studies.
 Juvenal Roca, is a man without scruples that has interest by Zora, convinces her aunt Paulina to take her. He has no affection and often humiliates her.

Production
It was one of the first drama miniseries produced in Bolivia. 
Both the literary and television production were well received by the public Santa Cruz of Bolivia.
The book has again gathered force through the TV series, but in television production only presented the story of manners and love, leaving aside the social background that is described in the novel.
The background music was played by outstanding musicians in the middle known as José René Moreno (on guitar), the synthesizer Pablo Orellana & Otto Rau. The opening theme was an instrumental song played on harmonica.

Broadcasting
Megavisión Channel 18 (re-released in 2007)

Cast 
in order of opening

See also
 La Virgen de las Siete Calles (book)

External links
Re-release on Megavisión
 The Miniseries and the novel

1987 Bolivian television series debuts
1987 Bolivian television series endings
Bolivian telenovelas
Spanish-language telenovelas
Red Uno de Bolivia original programming